René Valmy (24 December 1920 – 6 November 1977) was a French sprinter who competed in the 1948 Summer Olympics.

Competition record

References

1920 births
1977 deaths
Sportspeople from Tarbes
French male sprinters
Olympic athletes of France
Athletes (track and field) at the 1948 Summer Olympics